St. Denis station or Saint-Denis station may refer to:

 St. Denis station (MARC), St. Denis, Maryland
 Saint-Denis station, Saint-Denis, Seine-Saint-Denis, France
 Saint-Denis–Porte de Paris (Paris Métro)
 Saint-Denis Pleyel (Paris Métro)
 Saint-Denis-près-Martel station, Saint-Denis-lès-Martel, France

See also 

 St Denys railway station